Burkina Faso competed at the 2012 Summer Olympics in London, United Kingdom, from 27 July to 12 August 2012. This was the nation's eighth appearance at the Olympics, having participated since the 1972 Summer Olympics in Munich under the name "Upper Volta". Five athletes from Burkina Faso were selected to the team, 3 women and 2 men, competing only in athletics, judo, and swimming. Burkina Faso, however, has yet to win its first Olympic medal.

Athletics

Men

Women

Key
Note–Ranks given for track events are within the athlete's heat only
Q = Qualified for the next round
q = Qualified for the next round as a fastest loser or, in field events, by position without achieving the qualifying target
NR = National record
N/A = Round not applicable for the event
Bye = Athlete not required to compete in round

Judo

Swimming

Burkina Faso has gained two "Universality places" from the FINA.

Men

Women

References

External links 
 
 

Nations at the 2012 Summer Olympics
2012
Olympics